Standard Oil Building can refer to:

Standard Oil Building (Baltimore, Maryland), a 15-story historic office building in the United States
Standard Oil Building (Chicago), Illinois, now known as the Aon Center
Standard Oil Building (Cleveland), Ohio
Standard Oil Building (San Francisco), California
Standard Oil Building (New York City), New York
Standard Oil Building (Whittier, California)